Guido Loacker (born 13 February 1945) is an Austrian former sports shooter. He competed at the 1968 Summer Olympics and the 1972 Summer Olympics.

References

1945 births
Living people
Austrian male sport shooters
Olympic shooters of Austria
Shooters at the 1968 Summer Olympics
Shooters at the 1972 Summer Olympics
People from Feldkirch, Vorarlberg
Sportspeople from Vorarlberg
20th-century Austrian people